Albert Rhodes was an English professional footballer who played as a forward. He played in the Football League for Bournemouth and Boscombe Athletic, Torquay United and Cardiff City. He appeared as a guest player for Leeds United during World War II.

References

Date of death missing
Footballers from Devon
English footballers
Stockport County F.C. players
AFC Bournemouth players
Torquay United F.C. players
Cardiff City F.C. players
English Football League players
Association football forwards
Leeds United F.C. wartime guest players
Year of birth missing